Mason Kane Jobst (born February 17, 1994) is an American professional ice hockey left winger. He currently plays for the Rochester Americans in the American Hockey League (AHL).

Growing up in Indiana, Jobst played high school ice hockey for the Zionsville High School. Once making the jump to the Muskegon Lumberjacks of the United States Hockey League (USHL), Jobst played four seasons with them, serving as team captain each of his last two years. During this time, he committed to play NCAA Division I ice hockey for the Ohio State Buckeyes men's ice hockey team.

As a collegiate ice hockey player, Jobst was named a finalist for the Hobey Baker Award and Big Ten Men's Ice Hockey Player of the Year. As a senior, he also earned First Team All-Big Ten accolades and was named a CCM/AHCA Second Team West All-American.

Early life and education
Jobst was born on February 17, 1994, in Speedway, Indiana, U.S. to parents John and Amy. While both his parents were athletes growing up, he began playing ice hockey after receiving a hockey stick from his aunt. As a result, he learned how to skate at his grandfather's pond in Illinois and during trips to Pan Am Plaza before eventually enrolling in organized hockey leagues at the age of five. Growing up, Jobst was a fan of the Minnesota Golden Gophers. Jobst originally attended Speedway Senior High School before transferring to Zionsville Community High School to play high school hockey.

Playing career
As a student at Zionsville, Jobst also took part in USA Hockey’s annual player development camp in Rochester, New York, where he led the camp in scoring during his second year there. He was eventually drafted by the Muskegon Lumberjacks of the United States Hockey League (USHL) in 2011 but was reassigned to his AAA team. He began the 2011–12 season with the Indiana Jr. Ice U-18 team before joining the Lumberjacks and skating in 32 games. The following year, Jobst suffered a shoulder injury in October which led to surgery in May 2013 and a delayed start to the 2013–14 USHL season. Jobst committed to play NCAA Division I ice hockey for the Ohio State Buckeyes men's ice hockey team in October 2014, choosing them over Penn State, Nebraska-Omaha, and Western Michigan. Shortly thereafter, he suffered another shoulder injury which sidelined him for most of the season. As a result, he enrolled at Muskegon Community College and eased into a physical rehabilitation program.

Collegiate
Jobst joined the Buckeyes for his freshman year during the 2015–16 season while majoring in real estate and urban analysis.  By January, Jobst was the second-leading freshman scorer with six goals and 14 assists across the Big Ten. He was also named the Big Ten Third Star of the Week ending on January 19, 2016, after he led the league with seven points and continued his point streak to six games. As a result of his successful output, Jobst helped the Buckeyes advance to the semifinals of the Big Ten tournament. While the Buckeyes lost to Minnesota, Jobst was selected for the Big Ten All-Freshman Team.

Jobst returned to the Buckeyes for his sophomore season, where he led the league with 55 points in 39 games. Throughout the season, Jobst was named B1G First Star after recording three goals and four points at Penn State in January 2017. He ended the year ranking seventh in the NCAA in points and tied for second in assists. As a result, he earned Second Team All-America and First Team All-Big Ten accolades. He was also named an Academic All-Big Ten honoree and Ohio State Scholar-Athlete. Prior to the start of the 2017–18 season, Jobst was named team captain alongside his alternates Sasha Larocque and Luke Stork. He was also invited to participate in the development camps for the Pittsburgh Penguins and Boston Bruins.

As a senior at Ohio State, Jobst recorded a team-leading 17 goals in 35 games and ranked second with 19 assists. Among B1G games, he had 13 goals and 28 points which tied him fourth in points and first in goals among league skaters. In his second year as captain, Jobst scored the game-winning goal in double-overtime to lead Ohio State to the program's first Big Ten regular season hockey championship. Nearing the conclusion of his senior season, Jobst was named a finalist for the Hobey Baker Award, given annually to the top player in NCAA Division I men's hockey. He was also named a Big Ten Men's Ice Hockey Player of the Year finalist and earned First Team All-Big Ten accolades for the second time. He was also named a CCM/AHCA Second Team West All-American for the second time, becoming the first Buckeyes player to do so since 1999 and 1999. A few days later, Jobst also won the B1G Medal of Honor as someone who has "attained the greatest proficiency in athletics and scholastic work." He officially concluded his collegiate career on April 2, 2019, by signing a two-year entry-level contract with the New York Islanders.

Professional
Prior to the start of the 2020–21 season, Jobst was placed on waivers by the Islanders. Later that year, he was traded to the New Jersey Devils alongside A.J. Greer, the Islanders’ 2021 first-round pick, and a conditional fourth-rounder in 2022 in exchange for Kyle Palmieri and Travis Zajac. Upon joining the team, Greer and Jobst joined the Devils' AHL team, the Binghamton Devils. At the conclusion of the season, Jobst signed a one-year AHL contract with the Rochester Americans, the primary affiliate to the Buffalo Sabres.

In the following 2021–22 season, Jobst appeared in 26 regular season games with the Americans, posting 4 goals and 13 points. On March 28, 2022, Jobst was traded by Rochester to the San Jose Barracuda in exchange for Mark Alt.

As a free agent after his brief tenure with the Barracuda, Jobst returned to the Rochester Americans in the off-season by signing a one-year AHL contract on July 14, 2022.

Career statistics

Awards and honors

References

External links
 

1994 births
Living people
AHCA Division I men's ice hockey All-Americans
American men's ice hockey left wingers
Binghamton Devils players
Bridgeport Sound Tigers players
Sportspeople from Indiana
Muskegon Lumberjacks players
Ohio State Buckeyes men's ice hockey players
Rochester Americans players
San Jose Barracuda players
USA Hockey National Team Development Program players